Argyrotaenia pilalona is a species of moth of the family Tortricidae. It is found in Ecuador in the provinces of Cotopaxi, Napo, Pichincha and Morona-Santiago.

The wingspan is about 18.5 mm. The ground colour of the forewings is ochreous cream, but paler distally. The suffusions are weak and more brownish. The hindwings are cream tinged with ochreous apically.

Etymology
The species name refers to Pilaló, the type locality.

References

Moths described in 2008
pilalona
Moths of South America